The Best of Dragon and Mondo Rock is a collaborative  compilation album by Australian rock band Mondo Rock and New Zealand band Dragon, released in June 1990. The album peaked at number 47 on the ARIA Charts.

Track listing

Charts

Personnel 
Dragon
 Marc Hunter – vocals (1973–1979, 1982–1997)
 Todd Hunter – bass guitar, vocals (1972–1995, 2006–present)
 Jeffrey Bartolomei – keyboards (1989–1996)
 Mike Caen – guitar (1989–1995, 1996–1997)
Mondo Rock
 Ross Wilson – vocals, guitar, harmonica (1976–1991)
 James Gillard – bass guitar (1982–1990)
 Duncan Veall – keyboards (1984–1990)
 Eric McCusker – guitar, keyboards (1980–1991)
 John James Hackett – drums, percussion, guitar (1981–1990)

References 

1990 compilation albums
Mondo Rock albums
Dragon (band) albums
Compilation albums by Australian artists
Compilation albums by New Zealand artists
Split albums